Yuri Schukin (born 26 June 1979) is a retired Russian-born Kazakhstani tennis player.

Schukin has a career high ATP singles ranking of World No. 119, achieved on 19 November 2007. He also has a career high ATP doubles ranking of World No. 117, achieved on 16 October 2000.

Career

Schukin made his ATP Tour singles debut at the 2001 Australian Open where he battled through the qualifying rounds to earn a spot in the main draw. In qualifying, he defeated Neville Godwin 4–6, 6–1, 6–4, Eric Taino 7–5, 6–1 and lastly Robin Vik 0–6, 7–6(7–4), 8–6 to solidify the first main draw appearance of his career. In the first round he was defeated by Australian Wayne Arthurs in four sets 3–6, 5–7, 6–4, 2–6.

He made his ATP double main draw debut at the 2000 Dutch Open in Amsterdam, Netherlands. Alongside Orlin Stanoytchev, they were granted direct entry into the main doubles draw where they proceeded to defeat José Frontera and Sander Groen 6–4, 6–2 in the first round, and followed that up with an upset victory over the first seeds Thomas Shimada and Myles Wakefield 6–3, 3–6, 6–3 before eventually being defeated in the semi-finals at the hands of Edwin Kempes and Dennis van Scheppingen 4–6, 6–3, 1–6.

2008
He began the 2008 tour season by losing in the first round to Rajeev Ram at the Chennai Open 6–7, 6–7.

Santos has reached 19 career singles finals, with a record of 9 wins and 10 losses which includes an 8–8 record in ATP Challenger Tour finals. Additionally, he has reached 42 doubles finals with a record of 20 wins and 22 losses, including having an 0–1 record in ATP Tour finals and a 16–17 record in ATP Challenger Tour finals.

ATP career finals

Doubles: 1 (1 runner-up)

ATP Challenger and ITF Futures finals

Singles: 19 (9–10)

Doubles: 41 (20–21)

Performance timeline

Singles

References

External links
 
 
 

Expatriate sportspeople in Germany
Hopman Cup competitors
Kazakhstani people of Russian descent
Kazakhstani male tennis players
Tennis players from Berlin
People from Kislovodsk
1979 births
Living people
Russian male tennis players
Sportspeople from Stavropol Krai